The 1988 Women's World Snooker Championship was a women's snooker tournament that took place in October 1988. It was the 1988 edition of the World Women's Snooker Championship, first held in 1976. Holiday Club Pontins provided prize money totalling £10,000 and the event was held at their resort in Brixham.

The tournament was won by Allison Fisher, who lost only one  during the event and defeated Ann-Marie Farren 6–1 in the final. This was Fisher's third world snooker title, and she would go on to win a total of seven championships before focusing her efforts on pool in the United States from 1995.

Main draw

References 

1988 in English sport
1988 in snooker
1988 in women's sport
October 1988 sports events in the United Kingdom
International sports competitions hosted by England
1988